Babiloni is a surname of Spanish origin. Notable people with the surname include:

 Pascual Babiloni (1946–2023), Spanish footballer
 Paul Babiloni (born 1990), French footballer

See also
 

Surnames of Spanish origin